Tiar is a village in the southwestern corner of Bihiya block in Bhojpur district, Bihar, India. As of 2011, its population was 4,338, in 663 households.

References 

Villages in Bhojpur district, India